Brawijaya Stadium is a football stadium in the city of Kediri, East Java, Indonesia this stadium was built in 1983, and underwent renovations in 2000. Brawijaya Stadium has a capacity of 15,000 seats, as well as the headquarters for a football team with a big name in Indonesia, namely Persik Kediri which has the nickname the white tiger and has collected two Indonesian league titles and has also been the pride of the city of Kediri and Indonesia in the Asian arena in the AFC Champions League Tournament, Persik Kediri is a local club that has made achievements and history with hard struggles from bottom to top. and can bring Persik's name to the Indonesian football scene, the hope is that the Persik Kediri can revive the glory days of Kediri football.

Footnotes

Sports venues in Indonesia
Football venues in Indonesia
Buildings and structures in East Java
Sports venues completed in 1983